Soudley is a small village to the west of Cinderford, in the Forest of Dean, west Gloucestershire, England.It joins with Ruspidge to form a civil parish.

Nearby attractions include the Dean Heritage Centre, Soudley Ponds and the Blaize Bailey viewpoint. Activities at the Dean Heritage Centre include chain-saw wood carving and courses on manual wood turning to make items such as chairs and candlestick holders. There are also many educational resources available on site and, as a result, the Centre is regularly frequented by schools from the local area and Wales.

Through the village runs a small river, which hosts the annual Soudley Duck Race. Every year residents and visitors gather to sponsor ducks and race them the length of the village. The day is accompanied by a small fair that takes place in the village hall.

The village has a public house called the White Horse. It has two skittles teams and regularly hosts events such as quiz nights and snail races.

Soudley is a popular destination for tourists visiting the Forest of Dean, largely due to its proximity to the Dean Heritage Centre, but also because the local scenery and the village's location; nestled into a tight valley. There are a number of small guest houses in the village which cater for people who wish to enjoy the local countryside while having a base in Soudley for their holiday.

The village also has a football club that competes in North Gloucestershire Division 2 and is managed by Paul "rat boy" Johnson.

References

External links
 Ruspidge & Soudley Parish Council website; available soon
Dean Heritage Centre on AboutBritain.com
Dean Heritage Centre Official
photos of Soudley and surrounding area on geograph

Forest of Dean
Villages in Gloucestershire